Museum of Heart is an album by the American musician Dave Alvin, released in 1993. Alvin considered the album to be mainly in the soul blues style. He promoted Museum of Heart by touring with his band, the Guilty Men.

Production
The album was produced by Chris Silogyi, Bruce Bromberg, and Alvin; Bromberg encouraged Alvin to add more of a bluesy sound to his guitar work. Former Blaster Lee Allen played saxophone on some of the songs. Alvin worked on some of the songs for King of California during the same period. Syd Straw and Katy Moffatt contributed to the album.

"Thirty Dollar Room" is about the touring life. "Burning in Water, Drowning in Flame" takes its title from a Charles Bukowski poetry collection.

Critical reception

Trouser Press wrote that Alvin's "comfortable within his narrow [vocal] range, letting his pithy songwriting carry the load." The Chicago Reader noted that "even the least of Alvin’s material is redeemed by his robust energy and expansive delivery." The Fort Worth Star-Telegram praised the "clear-headed meditations on lost romance."

The Orlando Sentinel opined that "Alvin's rugged baritone is surprisingly effective on ballads." The Los Angeles Times concluded that "Alvin's lyrics convey the heartache and longing you hear in the voices of great country singers like George Jones but rarely find in their material anymore."

AllMusic's Denise Sullivan wrote that "Alvin's vision falters slightly, as none of the songs here are as instantly likable or classic as on previous outings."

Track listing
All songs by Dave Alvin.
"Museum of Heart" – 4:26
"Don't Talk About Her" – 4:59
"A Woman's Got a Right" – 4:58
"Between the Cracks" – 4:26
"Thirty Dollar Room" – 4:23
"The Devil's Wind" – 4:15
"Burning in Water, Drowning in Flame" – 3:09
"One Eye's Ballad" – 0:57
"Longer Than I Thought" – 5:05
"Six Nights a Week" – 3:40
"Stranger in Town" – 4:47
"As She Slowly Turns to Leave" – 5:26
"Florence Avenue Lullaby" – 1:16

Personnel
Dave Alvin – vocals, guitar
Don Falzone – bass
Rick Solem – keyboards, background vocals
Bobby Lloyd Hicks – drums
Donald Lindley – drums
Greg Leisz – guitar, mandolin, lap steel guitar
Michael "Bami" Rose – tenor saxophone, baritone saxophone
Lee Allen – tenor saxophone
Leon Haywood – organ
Stephen Hodges – congas, percussion, vibraphone
John Logan – background vocals
Syd Straw – background vocals
Fontaine Brown – background vocals
John Doe – background vocals
Katy Moffatt – background vocals

Production notes
Charlie Bracco – engineer, mixing
Chris Bellman – mastering
Stephen Walker – design
Beth Herzhaft – photography

References

Dave Alvin albums
1993 albums
HighTone Records albums
Soul blues albums